Alberto Suárez may refer to:

 Alberto Suárez (footballer) (born 1981), Spanish football player
 Alberto Suárez Inda (born 1939), Mexican prelate of the Roman Catholic Church
 Alberto Suárez (football manager) (born 1961), Colombian football manager
 Alberto Suárez Laso (born 1977), Spanish athlete